Oleksandr Kazik (born 22 October 1996) is a Ukrainian male visually impaired cross-country skier and biathlete.

Career
He made his Paralympic debut during the 2018 Winter Paralympics representing Ukraine. Oleksandr Kazik claimed his first Paralympic medal after clinching a silver medal in the men's 12.5km visually impaired biathlon event.

He won the bronze medal in the men's 6km visually impaired biathlon event at the 2021 World Para Snow Sports Championships held in Lillehammer, Norway. He also won the bronze medal in the men's 12.5km visually impaired biathlon event.

He competed at the 2022 Winter Paralympics, winning a gold medal in the men's 12.5 kilometres and a silver medal in the men's 6 kilometres visually impaired biathlon events.

References

External links 
 

1996 births
Living people
Ukrainian male cross-country skiers
Ukrainian male biathletes
Biathletes at the 2018 Winter Paralympics
Biathletes at the 2022 Winter Paralympics
Cross-country skiers at the 2018 Winter Paralympics
Paralympic biathletes of Ukraine
Paralympic cross-country skiers of Ukraine
Paralympic gold medalists for Ukraine
Paralympic silver medalists for Ukraine
Medalists at the 2018 Winter Paralympics
Medalists at the 2022 Winter Paralympics
Ukrainian blind people
Visually impaired category Paralympic competitors
Paralympic medalists in biathlon